Papilionanthe (abbreviated Ple.) is a genus of flowering plants from the orchid family, Orchidaceae. It is native to Southeast Asia, southern China, and the Indian Subcontinent.

Species
Papilionanthe biswasiana (Ghose & Mukerjee) Garay – Yunnan, Myanmar, Thailand
Papilionanthe greenii (W.W.Sm.) Garay – Bhutan
Papilionanthe hookeriana (Rchb.f.) Schltr. – Thailand, Vietnam, Malaysia, Borneo, Sumatra 
Papilionanthe pedunculata (Kerr) Garay – Cambodia, Vietnam
Papilionanthe sillemiana (Rchb.f.) Garay – Myanmar
Papilionanthe cylindrica (Lindl.) Seidenf. - India, Sri Lanka 
Papilionanthe teres (Roxb.) Schltr. – Yunnan, Bangladesh, Assam, Bhutan, India, Laos, Myanmar, Nepal, Thailand, Vietnam; naturalized in Fiji and Caroline Islands
Papilionanthe tricuspidata (J.J.Sm.) Garay – Bali, Lombok, Timor
Papilionanthe uniflora (Lindl.) Garay – Himalayas, Nepal, Bhutan, Assam
Papilionanthe vandarum (Rchb.f.) Garay – Himalayas, Nepal, Bhutan, Assam, Myanmar, China

Formerly included taxa
Papilionanthe subulata (Willd.) Garay from Borneo, Cambodia, Malaya, Thailand is a synonym of Thrixspermum filiforme 
Papilionanthe taiwaniana (S.S.Ying) Ormerod was formerly included as a species of the genus, but has since been re-classified as a hybrid of Papilionanthe teres and Luisia megasepala. It has been transferred to the nothogenus × Papilisia as × Papilisia taiwaniana (S.S.Ying) J.M.H.Shaw. Papilionanthe teres is not native to Taiwan, but has been introduced to the island. The other parent species Luisia megasepala is an endemic taiwanese species.

Hybrids
Papilionanthe Miss Joaquim is a hybrid of Papilionanthe teres and Papilionanthe hookeriana. It is the national flower of Singapore.

Hybrids of Papilionanthe with other genera are placed in the following nothogenera:
Papilionanda (Pda.) = Papilionanthe × Vanda
× Papilisia = Papilionanthe × Luisia

References

 Berg Pana, H. 2005. Handbuch der Orchideen-Namen. Dictionary of Orchid Names. Dizionario dei nomi delle orchidee. Ulmer, Stuttgart

 
Vandeae genera
Orchids of Asia